Anne Scott is a former broadcast journalist with Grampian Television, Anglia Television, Sky TV and the BBC.

Life
After a postgraduate diploma in journalism studies, she began her career as a reporter with the Grimsby Evening Times. After two years she moved to BRMB Radio in Birmingham to work as a reporter and news reader under Brian Shepherd. 

During the early 1990s, Scott was a news reporter for Anglia Television, covering North Cambridgeshire, South Lincolnshire and West Norfolk from a newsroom in Peterborough. She was one of the launch reporters for the sub-regional news programme Anglia News West.

In the mid nineties, she moved to Grampian Television (now STV North) and became a reporter and a presenters of North Tonight.

Scott was a reporter for Sky News before joining BBC Scotland as a radio news reader, television broadcast continuity announcer and transmission director. She retired in 2020.

References

Living people
Radio and television announcers
Scottish women radio presenters
Scottish women television presenters
STV News newsreaders and journalists
Year of birth missing (living people)